Flash Forward is an album by the Siegel–Schwall Band.  Released by Alligator Records in 2005, it was the second album recorded by the band after they re-formed in 1987, and their first studio album since R.I.P. Siegel/Schwall in 1974.

Flash Forward contains thirteen original songs, with multiple songs written by each of the four members of the band – Corky Siegel, Jim Schwall, Rollo Radford, and Sam Lay.  It reached number 9 on the Billboard blues album chart.

Track listing
"Afraid of Love" (Corky Siegel) – 4:42
"Deja Vous" (Siegel) – 4:24
"Going Back to Alabama" (Sam Lay) – 3:40
"The Underqualified Blues" (Jim Schwall) – 5:29
"Krazy" (Rollo Radford) – 4:40
"Can't Stop" (Siegel) – 4:38
"On the Road" (Schwall) – 3:38
"Twisted" (Siegel) – 3:49
"Rumors of Long Tall Sally" (Lay) – 3:05
"Hey Leviticus" (Schwall) – 2:42
"Sweet Liz" (Lay) – 3:34
"Pauline" (Radford) – 6:02
"Stormy Weather Love" (Lay) – 3:55

Personnel

Siegel–Schwall Band
Corky Siegel – harmonica, piano, vocals
Jim Schwall – guitar, mandolin, twelve-string guitar, accordion, vocals
Rollo Radford – electric bass, upright bass, vocals
Sam Lay – drums, vocals; guitar on "Stormy Weather Love"

Additional musicians
Marcy Levy – background vocals

Production
Corky Siegel – producer, engineer, liner notes
Holly Siegel – producer
Ken Goerries – co-producer, mixing, additional recording
Bruce Iglauer – additional mixing
Mitch Zelezny – mastering
Paul Natkin – photos
Kevin Niemiec – packaging design
Michael Trossman – Alligator logo

References

Siegel–Schwall Band albums
2005 albums
Alligator Records albums